The Collegio del Cambio, is the historic seat of the exchange guild in the Palazzo dei Priori in the city of Perugia, Italy. It was built between 1452 and 1457 and now houses a number of artistic masterpieces.

Sources
 NY Times

External links
 Perugia 

Buildings and structures in Perugia
Tourist attractions in Umbria
Museums in Perugia